Richard Freudenberg (9 February 1892 – 21 November 1975) was a German politician of the Free Democratic Party (FDP) and former member of the German Bundestag.

Life 
Freudenberg won the election in the Mannheim-Land constituency as a direct candidate with 43.69 % of the vote, ahead of the CDU candidate (25.54 %); the DVP had not put forward a candidate of its own. This made him, together with Eduard Edert (Flensburg constituency) and Franz Ott (Esslingen constituency), one of the independent representatives in the 1st German Bundestag. As an intern, Freudenberg joined the FDP faction and worked for them in the committees for foreign trade issues and internal reorganization.

Literature

References

1892 births
1975 deaths
Members of the Bundestag for Baden-Württemberg
Members of the Bundestag 1949–1953
Members of the Bundestag for the Free Democratic Party (Germany)